New Zealand competed at the 1972 Winter Olympics in Sapporo, Japan.  The country was represented by 2 athletes, Ross Ewington and Chris Womersley, both in the Alpine Skiing events.  Womersley finished 41st, and Ewington 49th (out of 54 competitors) in Downhill. The flagbearer at the opening ceremony was Alan Ward the team Manager.

Alpine skiing

Men

Men's slalom

References 
 
Official Olympic report (PDF format)
Olympic Winter Games 1972, full results by sports-reference.com

Nations at the 1972 Winter Olympics
1972
Winter Olympics